The 2003 LNBP was the 4th season of the Liga Nacional de Baloncesto Profesional, one of the professional basketball leagues of Mexico. It started on July 29, 2003 and ended on December 13, 2003. The league title was won by Panteras de Aguascalientes, which defeated La Ola Roja del Distrito Federal in the championship series, 4–2.

Format 
16 teams participate. The first 8 teams in the regular season standings qualify for the playoffs. The playoffs have quarterfinals (best-of-5), semifinals (best-of-7) and finals (best-of-7).

Teams

Regular season

Standings

Playoffs 
The playoffs were played between November 18 and December 13, 2003.

 Semifinals (best-of-7, November 26 – December 4, 2003):
 Semifinal 1
 November 26: Halcones UV Xalapa 110, Panteras de Aguascalientes 84
 November 27: Halcones UV Xalapa 91, Panteras de Aguascalientes 82
 November 29: Panteras de Aguascalientes 103, Halcones UV Xalapa 92
 November 30: Panteras de Aguascalientes 96, Halcones UV Xalapa 83
 December 1: Panteras de Aguascalientes 96, Halcones UV Xalapa 85
 December 3: Halcones UV Xalapa 101, Panteras de Aguascalientes 77
 December 4: Panteras de Aguascalientes 103, Halcones UV Xalapa 84

Panteras de Aguascalientes wins the series 4–3 and qualify for the finals.

 Semifinal 2
 November 26: La Ola Roja del Distrito Federal 103, Lobos de la UAdeC 92
 November 27: La Ola Roja del Distrito Federal 91, Lobos de la UAdeC 82
 November 29: Lobos de la UAdeC 121, La Ola Roja del Distrito Federal 101
 November 30: Lobos de la UAdeC 102, La Ola Roja del Distrito Federal 96
 December 1: Lobos de la UAdeC 96, La Ola Roja del Distrito Federal 94
 December 3: La Ola Roja del Distrito Federal 109, Lobos de la UAdeC 72
 December 4: La Ola Roja del Distrito Federal 114, Lobos de la UAdeC 112

La Ola Roja del Distrito Federal wins the series 4–3 and qualify for the finals.

 Finals (best-of-7, December 6– December 13, 2003):
 December 6: La Ola Roja del Distrito Federal 89, Panteras de Aguascalientes 83
 December 7: La Ola Roja del Distrito Federal 87, Panteras de Aguascalientes 84
 December 9: Panteras de Aguascalientes 101, La Ola Roja del Distrito Federal 87
 December 10: Panteras de Aguascalientes 81, La Ola Roja del Distrito Federal 80
 December 11: Panteras de Aguascalientes 85, La Ola Roja del Distrito Federal 78
 December 13: Panteras de Aguascalientes 100, La Ola Roja del Distrito Federal 91

 Panteras de Aguascalientes wins the LNBP finals, 4–2.

All-Star Game 
In 2003, two All-Star Games were played. The first game was played in Fresnillo on September 21 and was won by the Foreigners team, 134–112. The second game was played in Matamoros and saw the Foreigners win, 117–90.

Teams 
Teams for the first All-Star Game:

Mexicanos
 Miguel Acuña (Zorros de la UMSNH)
 Víctor Buelna (Zorros de la UMSNH)
 Isaac Gildea (Algodoneros de la Comarca)
 Javier González Rex (La Ola Roja del Distrito Federal)
 Abel Huerta (Tuberos de Colima)
 Alonso Izaguirre (Fuerza Regia de Monterrey)
 Eduardo Liñán (Correcaminos UAT Matamoros)
 Omar López (Tecos de la UAG)
 José Lozoya Portillo (Santos Reales de San Luis)
 Víctor Mariscal (Lobos de la UAdeC)
 Omar Quintero (Correcaminos UAT Victoria)
 Octavio Robles (Halcones UV Xalapa)
 Edwin Sánchez (Gambusinos de Fresnillo)
 Felipe Sánchez (Fuerza Regia de Monterrey)
 Francisco Siller (Lobos de la UAdeC)
 Coaches: Héctor Santos (Fuerza Regia de Monterrey)

Extranjeros
  Quincy Alexander (Correcaminos UAT Victoria)
  Chad Allen (Algodoneros de la Comarca)
  Kevin Beard (Correcaminos UAT Matamoros)
  Samuel Bowie (Tecos de la UAG)
  Devon Ford (Panteras de Aguascalientes)
  Rodney Gidney (Barreteros de Zacatecas)
  Reggie Jordan (Cometas de Querétaro)
  Carmelo Antrone Lee (Leñadores de Durango)
  Eric Martin (La Ola Roja del Distrito Federal)
  Jason McCutcheon (Lobos de la UAdeC)
  Tayron McDaniel (Correcaminos UAT Victoria)
  Eric Redeaux (Gambusinos de Fresnillo)
  Antonio Rivers (Fuerza Regia de Monterrey)
  Gerald Williams (Fuerza Regia de Monterrey)
 Coaches:  Eduardo Opezzo (Gambusinos de Fresnillo)

References

External links 
 2003 LNBP season on Latinbasket.com

LNBP seasons
2003 in Mexican sports
2003–04 in North American basketball